Maamorilik (old spelling: Mârmorilik or Maarmorilik, also Black Angel Mine) is a mining site in the Avannaata municipality in northwestern Greenland.

Geography 

History 
The first excavations in Maamorilik took place from 1938, possibly earlier, with operations continuing until 1945, and again from 1973 to 25 July 1990 when the mine was closed. During seventeen years of operation, the mine yield of zinc ore amounted to 12 mln tonnes.

Reactivation 
In 2008 the government of Greenland decided to reinvigorate mining activities in Maamorilik, aiming to provide an economic lifeline to the communities of the Uummannaq region, keeping the relatively new Qaarsut Airport open. Proceeds from mineral resources exploitation will provide Greenland with a counterbalance to the lump-sum subsidies from Denmark.

The operations are carried out by Angel Mining plc, a UK-registered company. As of April 2010, work continues on widening of the mine entrance to the required . The mine is due to reopen in 2013, with zinc and iron ore reserves expected to last for 50 years. Prospective employment is estimated at 110 people.

Transport 

Heavy transport including mining products was and will be transported by ship. A port exists at the fjord. An aerial tramway was used to connect to the mine at 750 m above the fjord.

Notable People
Thue Christiansen, Greenlandic Teacher, Known for Creating the flag of Greenland

References

External links 
 Photographs of Maamorilik from the 1970s

Iron mines in Greenland
Lead mines in Greenland
Silver mines in Greenland
Uummannaq Fjord
Zinc mines in Greenland